Hemasiri Fernando (born 12 October 1949) is the former permanent secretary to the Ministry of Defence and chief of staff of the president, chairman Board of Investment of Sri Lanka.

Early childhood

Hemasiri was educated at Nalanda College, Colombo. While at school he was an athlete, basketball and football player and thereafter he captained the cricket team of University of Ceylon, Colombo in 1971. While at Nalanda, his university entrance class master was Premasara Epasinghe.

Public service career
He has been the former secretary to the prime minister Sirimavo Bandaranaike, former Chairman of Sri Lanka Telecom Ltd, former chairman Airport and Aviation Authority. He has also represented Sri Lanka in rifle shooting in the small bore event in the 1982 Asian Games in New Delhi and finished in sixth place. Hemasiri is former Secretary Ministry of Postal Services, former secretary to the prime minister, former chairman of Sri Lanka Telecom, People's Bank (Sri Lanka), and the Airport and Aviation Authority, former chairman National Olympic Committee of Sri Lanka, vice president of the Associação dos Comités Olímpicos de Língua Oficial Portuguesa, Commonwealth Games Federation. He was the defence secretary of Sri Lanka until 25 April 2019, when he resigned, taking responsibility due to the series of blasts which rocked the island nation in the previous days.

Bibliography
 Essays on Ceylon Railways (1864-1964) (2018)
 The Uva Railway, Railway to the Moon (2014)
 The Viceroy Special (2013)

See also
List of Sri Lankan non-career Permanent Secretaries

References

 

 

 By Chris DHAMBARAGE 

 By Chinthana WASALA 

 

 More military personnel to be implicated

1949 births
Sri Lankan Buddhists
Alumni of Nalanda College, Colombo
Alumni of the University of Ceylon (Colombo)
Living people
Sinhalese civil servants
Permanent secretaries of Sri Lanka